There are at least 15 named lakes and reservoirs in Cleburne County, Arkansas.

Lakes
 Trestle Hole, el.

Reservoirs
 Betty Brown Lake, el.  
 Bullard Lake, el.  
 Dunaway Lake, el.  
 Greers Ferry Lake, el.  
 Greers Ferry Nursery Pond, el.  
 Grisso Lake, el.  
 Kennedy Lake, el.  
 Lake Eden, el.  
 Magness Lake, el.  
 Miss Jenny Lake, el.  
 Parish Lake, el.  
 Rodgers Lake, el.  
 Sherlock Lake, el.  
 Stair Lake, el.

See also
 List of lakes in Arkansas

Notes

Bodies of water of Cleburne County, Arkansas
Cleburne